Charles H. Manly (September 16, 18431930) was a Michigan politician.

Early life
Manly was born in Livingston County, Michigan on September 16, 1843.

Military career
Manly fought in the American Civil War for the Union Army. Manly was injured twice and lost his left arm in the battle of Gettysburg on July 2, 1863.

Political career
On November 2, 1886, Manly was elected to the Michigan House of Representatives where he represented the Washtenaw County 1st district from January 5, 1887, to 1888. Manly was backed by both the Democrats and the Greenback Party. Manly was not re-elected in 1914. Manly served as mayor of Ann Arbor from 1890 to 1891.

Death
Manly was hit and killed by a train in Jackson, Michigan in 1930.

References

1843 births
1930 deaths
Union Army soldiers
People of Michigan in the American Civil War
Michigan Greenbacks
Democratic Party members of the Michigan House of Representatives
People from Livingston County, Michigan
American politicians with disabilities
American amputees
Accidental deaths in Michigan
Burials in Michigan
Mayors of Ann Arbor, Michigan
19th-century American politicians
Railway accident deaths in the United States